Nahiyeh (also Romanized as Nāḩīyeh) is a village in Owzrud Rural District, Baladeh District, Nur County, Mazandaran Province, Iran. At the 2006 census, its population was 125, in 46 families.

References 

Populated places in Nur County